Boris Dvoršek (born 9 November 1970 in Zagreb) is a Croatian handball coach who is currently assistant coach in Croatian national handball team.

Honours
Zagreb (Youth)
Croatian Handball U-18 Championship (3): 1994, 1995, 1996
Croatian Handball U-21 Championship (4): 1993, 1994, 1995, 2003

ŽRK Trešnjevka Zagreb
2.HRL - West (1): 2004-05

Zagreb
Dukat Premier League (2): 2012-13, 2013-14
Croatian Cup (2): 2013, 2014
SEHA League (1): 2012-13

Borac Banja Luka
Handball Cup of Bosnia and Herzegovina (1): 2015

SSV Bozen Loacker-Volksbank
Serie A (1): 2019
Handball Cup of Italy (1): 2019

References

External links
sportilus profile

RK Zagreb coaches
Sportspeople from Zagreb
1970 births
Living people
Croatian handball coaches